{{DISPLAYTITLE:C14H21N3O3S}}
The molecular formula C14H21N3O3S (molar mass: 311.400 g/mol, exact mass: 311.1304 u) may refer to:

 Metahexamide
 Tolazamide

Molecular formulas